Charles David Williams (July 30, 1860 - February 14, 1923) was the fourth Bishop of Michigan in the Episcopal Church in the United States of America. He was an advocate of the "Social Gospel" views of Walter Rauschenbusch.

Personal
Charles David Williams was born July 30, 1860, in Bellevue, Ohio. He was educated at Kenyon College and Bexley Hall where he was ordained an Episcopal deacon on June 17, 1883, and priest on October 30, 1884. He died February 14, 1923.

Professional
Williams served as priest of Fernbank, Ohio, and Riverside, Ohio, from 1884 to 1889; as deacon at St. Paul's in Steubenville, Ohio, from 1889 to 1893; and as dean of Trinity Cathedral in Cleveland from 1893 to 1906. In 1906, he was consecrated as bishop of the Michigan Diocese of the Episcopal Church, where he remained until his death in 1923.

In his religious and social views, Williams was a liberal clergyman who advocated for the views of Walter Rauschenbush. Williams believed that the church should play an active role in resolving social problems. Although convinced that the church would always need to minister to individual philanthropic causes, he argued equally vigorously that the established denominations, in their teachings and advocacy of basic principles, should support reform of the economic and industrial system.

He was a member of the commission of church leaders that investigated the steel industry and was national president of the Church League for Industrial Democracy. After the January 1920 raids in Detroit, Williams was recruited as part of a citizens committee to help release the over 1000 men illegally arrested for peaceful assembly by the Justice Department run by General Palmer. This citizen's committee was led by Federick F. Ingram and the other members were S. S. Kresge, F. E. Brown, F. E. Steelwagen, and Fred M. Butzel. In 1921, he attended a seminar in England that studied the English labor movement in its relation with the church.

References

External links
 
 Charles David Williams papers at Bentley Historical Library
Bibliographic directory from Project Canterbury

1860 births
1923 deaths
People from Bellevue, Ohio
Clergy from Detroit
Kenyon College alumni
Episcopal bishops of Michigan
Burials at Woodlawn Cemetery (Detroit)